The First Hotze House is a historic house at 1620 South Main Street in Little Rock, Arkansas.  Located in what was once the outskirts of the city, it is an L-shaped single story wood-frame structure, with a gabled roof, weatherboard trim, and a foundation of brick piers.  A porch extends across most of its front facade, supported by paired square columns with brackets and a dentillated cornice.  The building corners are adorned with Italianate pilasters and paired brackets.  Built in 1869 and restored in 2000–01, it was the first post-Civil War home of Peter Hotze, a prominent local merchant and real estate developer.  (His second, more elaborate home, stands just around the corner.)

The house was listed on the National Register of Historic Places in 2006.

See also
National Register of Historic Places listings in Little Rock, Arkansas

References

Houses on the National Register of Historic Places in Arkansas
Italianate architecture in Arkansas
Houses completed in 1869
Houses in Little Rock, Arkansas
National Register of Historic Places in Little Rock, Arkansas
Historic district contributing properties in Arkansas